New York's 102nd State Assembly district is one of the 150 districts in the New York State Assembly. It has been represented by Christopher Tague since 2018.

Geography

2020s 
District 102 contains all of Schoharie and Greene counties, and portions of Albany, Delaware, Otsego and Ulster counties.

2010s 
District 102 contains all of Schoharie and Greene counties, and portions of Albany, Columbia, Delaware, Otsego and Ulster counties.

Recent election results

2022

2020

2018

2018 special

2016

2014

2012

References 

102
Greene County, New York
Schoharie County, New York
Albany County, New York
Columbia County, New York
Delaware County, New York
Otsego County, New York
Ulster County, New York